A Shot (Pucanj) is a 1977 Croatian film directed by Krešo Golik, starring Božidar Orešković and Marko Nikolić.

References

External links
 
 

1977 films
1970s Croatian-language films
Films directed by Krešo Golik
Croatian drama films
1977 drama films
Yugoslav drama films